The Cathedral of the Holy Cross is an Anglican cathedral located in the Cathedral Hill neighborhood of Lusaka, Zambia, and the seat and mother church of the Diocese of Lusaka. The cathedral was constructed in 1962.

References

External links
Cathedral of the Holy Cross

Cathedrals in Zambia
Anglican cathedrals in Zambia
Buildings and structures in Lusaka
Churches completed in 1962
20th-century Anglican church buildings